Chadron is a city and the county seat of Dawes County, in the state of Nebraska in the Great Plains region of the United States. The population was 5,851 at the 2010 census. This city is the location of Chadron State College.

Chadron also is the United States Forest Service headquarters of the Nebraska and Samuel R. McKelvie National Forests, and the Buffalo Gap, Fort Pierre, and Oglala National Grasslands. The Museum of the Fur Trade is located near Chadron, at the site of the American Fur Company's former Bordeaux Trading Post.

History
Succeeding cultures of indigenous peoples lived in the area for thousands of years.  In historic times, tribes such as the Oglala Lakota (Oglala Sioux Tribe), Cheyenne and others lived in the area. The Sioux used this territory as a hunting ground after pushing other tribes to the west.

Chadron is named for Louis Chartran, a French-Indian (Métis) fur trapper who ran a trading post on 
Chadron Creek in 1841.  He was married to a Native American woman.

In 1884 the town was formally established when the Fremont, Elkhorn, and Missouri Valley Railroad was constructed through the area from Omaha, Nebraska, en route to Wyoming. Chadron was first named O'Linn for its founder Fannie O'Linn, who built a community at the confluence of the White River and Chadron Creek.  This is where the railroad was expected to branch.  When it was built six miles away on Bordeaux Creek, the townspeople packed up the entire town—buildings included—and moved it to the new location.

Among the founders of the town were the businessman Charles Henry King and his wife Martha.  King established retail and freight businesses and banks in towns along the railroad's route; he capitalized on the flow of settlers and pioneers to the region.  Four of the five King children were born in Chadron, including their second son Leslie Lynch King.  In 1908 the family moved to Omaha, the business center of the state.  In 1912 Leslie married, and in July 1913 became the father of the future president, Gerald Ford. King and his wife divorced soon after that.

During the 1893 Chicago World's Fair, Chadron was the starting point of the 1,000-mile "Chadron-Chicago Cowboy Horse Race."  Nine riders competed for the $1,000 prize to be the first to reach the entrance of Buffalo Bill's Wild West Show.  Among the riders was the former outlaw Doc Middleton.  John Berry won the race in 13 days and 16 hours.

In the Lakota language, Chadron is known as čhápa wakpá otȟúŋwahe, meaning "beaver river city".

In September 2021, internet celebrity Amir Blumenfeld, due to an outcry on the internet and from fellow Los Angeles residents, agreed to move to Chadron as it is the mid-point between Los Angeles and New York City. He confirmed the relocation on Episode 507 of the If I Were You podcast with co-host Jake Hurwitz and special guest, Geoffrey James.

Geography and climate
Chadron is located at 3,400 feet in elevation. It is surrounded by prairie grassland, broken by a ridge of lightly forested hills to the south.

The hillside letter C can be seen in the south.

Chadron has a highly variable four season humid continental climate (Koppen: Dfb). Summertime is usually hot, with high daily temperature ranges. Wintertime is relatively cold, with lows usually in the teens. Precipitation is light year round but peaks in May and June.

Major Routes in Chadron

Demographics

2010 census
As of the census of 2010, there were 5,851 people, 2,306 households, and 1,194 families living in the city. The racial makeup of the city was 87.8% White, 1.6% African American, 5.1% Native American, 0.8% Asian, 0.6% Pacific Islander, 1.1% from other races, and 2.9% from two or more races. Hispanic or Latino of any race were 3.6% of the population.

There were 2,306 households, of which 25.9% had children under the age of 18 living with them, 38.6% were married couples living together, 9.6% had a female householder with no husband present, 3.6% had a male householder with no wife present, and 48.2% were non-families. 38.3% of all households were made up of individuals, and 13.6% had someone living alone who was 65 years of age or older. The average household size was 2.16 and the average family size was 2.89.

The median age in the city was 26.8 years. 19.5% of residents were under the age of 18; 27.5% were between the ages of 18 and 24; 21.5% were from 25 to 44; 18.3% were from 45 to 64; and 13.1% were 65 years of age or older. The gender makeup of the city was 49.0% male and 51.0% female.

2000 census
As of the census of 2000, there were 5,634 people, 2,187 households, and 1,150 families living in the city. The population density was 1,553.4 people per square mile (599.3/km). There were 2,441 housing units at an average density of 673.0 per square mile (259.6/km). The racial makeup of the city was 92.99% White, 0.66% African American, 3.30% Native American, 0.32% Asian, 0.09% Pacific Islander, 1.14% from other races, and 1.51% from two or more races. Hispanic or Latino of any race were 2.72% of the population.

There were 2,187 households, out of which 24.6% had children under the age of 18 living with them, 41.0% were married couples living together, 8.8% had a female householder with no husband present, and 47.4% were non-families. 34.4% of all households were made up of individuals, and 12.9% had someone living alone who was 65 years of age or older. The average household size was 2.20 and the average family size was 2.87.

In the city, the population was spread out, with 18.3% under the age of 18, 32.0% from 18 to 24, 19.9% from 25 to 44, 16.9% from 45 to 64, and 12.9% who were 65 years of age or older. The median age was 25 years. For every 100 females, there were 92.2 males. For every 100 females age 18 and over, there were 88.1 males.

As of 2000 the median income for a household in the city was $27,400, and the median income for a family was $44,420. Males had a median income of $30,353 versus $17,183 for females. The per capita income for the city was $16,312. About 11.0% of families and 21.4% of the population were below the poverty line, including 15.4% of those under age 18 and 10.3% of those age 65 or over.

Festivals and customs
Every July, Chadron hosts an annual community celebration called "Fur Trade Days," in honor of its origins as a fur and hide trading post for French and other settlers in the Great Plains during the 19th century.  Chadron's Museum of the Fur Trade is the largest of its kind in the United States and attracts thousands of visitors every year.

Transportation
Chadron is served by Chadron Municipal Airport.

Education

 Chadron State College
 Chadron Senior High School
Chadron Middle School
 Chadron Intermediate School
 Chadron Primary School

Media

AM radio
 KCSR 610

FM radio
 KCNB, 94.7
 KQSK, 97.5
 KCNE, 91.9

Newspaper
 The Chadron Record

Notable people
 Poe Ballantine, novelist and essayist
 Don Beebe, former NFL wide receiver
 Justin Bruening, television actor
 James Dahlman, longtime mayor of Omaha, Nebraska
 Mary E. Smith Hayward, businesswoman; for 50 years, proprietor of the M. E. Smith & Co. Twin Stores in Chadron
 Charles Henry King, businessman known for founding Chadron and other cities; father of Leslie Lynch King
 Leslie Lynch King, Sr., the biological father of President Gerald Ford
 Tim Walz, 41st governor of Minnesota (2019–present)
 Danny Woodhead, Former football player, mostly for the New England Patriots and San Diego Chargers and holder of a number of NCAA records

References

External links

 City of Chadron
 Chadron Record, newspaper

 
Cities in Nebraska
Cities in Dawes County, Nebraska
County seats in Nebraska
French-American history of Nebraska
Populated places established in 1884
1884 establishments in Nebraska